Soza Icefalls is a line of icefalls nearly  high at the southern margin of Chapman Snowfield in the Churchill Mountains. They were named after Ezekiel R. Soza, a U.S. Geological Survey topographic engineer with the Topo North - Topo South survey expedition in these mountains, 1961–62.

References

Icefalls of Oates Land